This is an alphabetical list of known Hindi songs performed by Kishore Kumar from 1946 till 1987. Over 1600 songs are listed here. Moreover, singers recreate songs of Kumar duets. He had also sung in several other different languages which are not included here.

Hindi songs

1940s

1946

1948

1949

1950s

1950

1951

1952

1953

1954

1955

1956

1957

1958

1959

1960s

1960

1961

1962

1963

1964

1965

1966

1967

1968

1969

1970s

1970

1971

1972

1973

1974

1975

1976

1977

1978

1979

1980s

1980

1981

1982

1983

1984

1985

1986

1987

1988

1989

1990s

1990

1991

1992

1993

1994

1997

2000s-2010s

2001

2005

2007

2008

2013

2014

2019

Hindi Non-film songs

Telugu songs

Tamil songs

Bengali songs

Kannada songs

Malayalam songs

Marathi songs 

 "Tuzhi Mazhi Jodi Jamli"
 "Ha Gora Gora Mukhada...O lage chand ka tukada"

References

External links 
 

Lists of songs recorded by Indian singers